Michael William Vincent Collins (born 3 June 1993) is a professional rugby union player who plays Centre for the Ospreys team in the United Rugby Championship. He is a former captain of the Otago Boys' High School 1st XV and a former New Zealand Schools representative. He has turned down offers from the NRL franchise the Melbourne Storm and ITM Cup Premiership side Waikato to play for Otago.

Career
Collins made his Otago debut in 2012, and played for the NPC side until 2020.

In 2015, Collins joined Welsh club the Scarlets on a short-term contract, returning to New Zealand at the end of the season.

Upon his return to New Zealand, Collins joined Super Rugby team the Blues.

Otago-born Collins joined his home region, the Highlanders, for the 2020 Super Rugby season and was involved with the side for the next two seasons.

Collins returned to Wales in 2021, joining the Ospreys in the newly formed United Rugby Championship. He made his debut on 26 September 2021, scoring two tries in a Man of the Match performance against the Dragons.

Personal life
Collins is Welsh-qualified, through his Llanelli-born grandfather.

References

External links
Michael Collins New Zealand U20s profile
Ospreys profile

1993 births
New Zealand rugby union players
Otago rugby union players
Rugby union centres
People from Queenstown, New Zealand
People educated at Otago Boys' High School
Scarlets players
New Zealand expatriate rugby union players
New Zealand expatriate sportspeople in Wales
Expatriate rugby union players in Wales
Living people
Blues (Super Rugby) players
Highlanders (rugby union) players
Ospreys (rugby union) players
Rugby union players from Otago